The 1995–96 FIBA European League, also shortened to 1995–96 FIBA EuroLeague, was the 39th installment of the European top-tier level professional club competition for basketball clubs (now called EuroLeague). It began on September 7, 1995, and ended on April 11, 1996. The competition's Final Four was held at Paris.

It was the last season of the competition that took place under the name of FIBA European League, as the competition was renamed to FIBA EuroLeague, starting with the next season.

Competition system
42 teams (the cup title holder, national domestic league champions, and a variable number of other clubs from the most important national domestic leagues) played knock-out rounds on a home and away basis. The aggregate score of both games decided the winner. 
The sixteen remaining teams after the knock-out rounds entered the Regular Season Group Stage, divided into two groups of eight teams, playing a round-robin. The final standing was based on individual wins and defeats. In the case of a tie between two or more teams after the group stage, the following criteria were used to decide the final classification: 1) number of wins in one-to-one games between the teams; 2) basket average between the teams; 3) general basket average within the group.
The top four teams from each group after the Regular Season Group Stage qualified for a quarterfinal playoff (X-pairings, best of 3 games).
The four winners of the quarterfinal playoff qualified for the final stage (Final Four), which was played at a predetermined venue.

First round

|}

Second round

|}
Automatically qualified to the second round
 FC Barcelona Banca Catalana
 Olympiacos
 Olympique Antibes

Group stage
If one or more clubs are level on won-lost record, tiebreakers are applied in the following order:
Head-to-head record in matches between the tied clubs
Overall point difference in games between the tied clubs
Overall point difference in all group matches (first tiebreaker if tied clubs are not in the same group)
Points scored in all group matches
Sum of quotients of points scored and points allowed in each group match

Quarterfinals

|}

Final four

Semifinals
April 9, Palais Omnisports de Paris-Bercy, Paris

|}

3rd place game
April 11, Palais Omnisports de Paris-Bercy, Paris

|}

Final
April 11, Palais Omnisports de Paris-Bercy, Paris

|}

Final standings

Awards

FIBA European League Top Scorer
 Joe Arlauckas ( Real Madrid Teka)

FIBA European League Final Four MVP
 Dominique Wilkins ( Panathinaikos)

FIBA European League Finals Top Scorer
 Artūras Karnišovas ( FC Barcelona Banca Catalana)

FIBA European League All-Final Four Team

References

External links
1995–96 FIBA European League
1995–96 FIBA European League
Eurobasket.com 1995–96 FIBA European League

 
1995-1996